Palbasha Siddique (born January 3, 1991)  is a Bangladeshi born American singer. She is best known for her performance of Praan, a song adapted from the collection of poems Gitanjali by Rabindranath Tagore, with music composed by Garry Schyman for Matt Harding's "Dancing 2008" video.

Early life and career
Siddique was born in Bangladesh. She moved to Minneapolis, Minnesota, with her family at age 10. She received a scholarship to MacPhail Center for Music and sang in her schools' choirs and theater programs. At age 11, she sang God Bless America during the seventh-inning stretch at a Minnesota Twins game. She attended De La Salle High School for two years and sang in both the concert and a cappella choirs.

While a 17-year-old student at Southwest High School, Siddique participated in KFAI radio's 1st International Women's Day program with Irina in March 2007. A video clip of her singing for the Minneapolis radio station was posted to YouTube by Rajib Bahar. Harding's co-producer Melissa Nixon found the videos as Schyman was looking for a vocalist to perform "Praan," whose lyrics are written in Bengali and based on poetry by Rabindranath Tagore.  Schyman flew Siddique and her mother to Los Angeles for a day of recording in mid-June 2008. "Palbasha was the consummate professional, perfectly in-pitch and absolutely belying her age," Schyman told the Minneapolis Star-Tribune.

The "Dancing 2008" video was posted soon afterward, and Praan climbed into the top-10 list of soundtrack downloads at Amazon.com.

In November 2008, Matt and the vocalist Palbasha were interviewed by KFAI radio in Minnesota. The interview focused on how the "Dance 2008" project came to include Palbasha.

In 2013, Palbasha earned her bachelor's degree in psychology from the University of Minnesota, Twin Cities.

She lives in Chicago now and married to Dr. Durjoy Siddique, a civil engineer and musician. Together they perform their songs as a musical duo known as MOYNA.

Discography
Studio albums
2010: Bhalobashi Tai
2011: Bhalobashi Tai Bhalobeshe Jai
Compilation albums
2011: Shihoron
2012: Nari
2013: Shomonnoy
2013: 360 

Singles
2009: In loss of all hopes
2010: Nijete Phire
2010: Nesha- The Addiction
2010: Mumbasa TV series title song
2015: Tolpar
2022: Hoyto

Cover songs
2008: Praan - Modern Rabindra song
2010: Beautiful Disaster- - Kelly Clarkson
2010: Don't Stop Believin' - Journey
2010: Blackbird - The Beatles
2012: Someone like you -  Adele
2013: Payphone - Maroon 5
2013: Young and Beautiful - "Lana Del Rey
2014: All of Me - "John Legend"

References

External links
Dancing 2008 video featuring Praan

Living people
Bangladeshi emigrants to the United States
21st-century Bangladeshi women singers
21st-century Bangladeshi singers
1991 births
Musicians from Minneapolis
Singers from Minnesota
21st-century American women singers
21st-century American singers